Fiat Citivan may refer to:

 A version of the Fiat 900T

 A version of the Fiat Duna

Citivan